Hindman is a surname. It may also refer to:

 Hindman, Kentucky, United States, a home-rule town
 Hindman Settlement School, a settlement school in Hindman, Kentucky
 Hindman, Texas, United States, an unincorporated community
 Leslie Hindman Auctioneers, Chicago, USA

See also
 Fort Hindman, a Confederate Civil War fort